Paloma Faith undertook her first major tour in 2010. The United Kingdom leg of the tour was confirmed on 4 November 2009, when Faith announced that she would visit the United Kingdom and Ireland starting on 17 March 2010. The tour featured songs from Faith's album, Do You Want the Truth or Something Beautiful?. In April 2010, Faith extended her tour for throughout October and November, where she visited a number of different venues.

Supporting acts
Josh Weller
La Shark
Bashy
Alan Pownell
Eliza Doolittle

Sample setlist (March 2010)
"Smoke & Mirrors"
"Stone Cold Sober"
"Romance Is Dead"
"Broken Doll"
"Do You Want the Truth or Something Beautiful"
"God Bless This Child" (Billie Holiday cover)
"Sexy Minx" (Cover of David Guetta's Sexy Bitch)
"Stargazer"
"You Never Give Me Your Money" (The Beatles cover)
"Love Ya"
"Upside Down"
"Play On"
Encore
"At Last"(Etta James Cover)
"New York"

Source:

Tour dates
Below is a full list of tour dates.

References

2010 concert tours